Janek is an Estonian and Polish male given name.

People named Janek include:
 Janek Gwizdala (born 1978), English jazz bassist and record producer
 Janek Juzek (born 1892), Czech exporter of orchestral string instruments bearing his Anglican name, John Juzek
 Janek Kiisman (born 1972), Estonian footballer
 Janek Mäggi (born 1973), Estonian politician, television presenter and writer
 Janek Meet (born 1974), Estonian footballer
 Janek Mela (born 1988), Polish explorer, teenage double amputee, youngest person to reach the North Pole
 Janek Õiglane (born 1994), Estonian decathlete
 Janek Pawel Pietrzak (1984–2008), United States Marine Corps Sergeant murdered in 2008
 Janek Schaefer (born 1970), English sound artist, composer, entertainer
 Janek Ratnatunga, Sri Lankan born Australian academic
 Janek Roos (born 1974), Danish badminton player
 Janek Sirrs (born 1965), visual effects artist
 Janek Sternberg (born 1992), German footballer
 Janek Tombak (born 1976), Estonian professional road bicycle racer
 Janek Wiśniewski, fictional name given to Zbigniew Godlewski in the poem Ballad of Janek Wiśniewski

References

Estonian masculine given names
Polish masculine given names